Elegant Too is an American record production and film and television composer duo based in New York. The duo consists of Chris Maxwell and Phil Hernandez. Some of their notable collaborations include TV shows Bob's Burgers, Inside Amy Schumer, and the film Scare Me, which premiered at the 2020 Sundance Film Festival.

Elegant Too are recipients of the ASCAP Screen Music Award (2018), as well as having been participants in the ASCAP / Columbia University film work shop. They were also the winners of The Doodle Award for Collaborative Achievement in the ASCAP/ Columbia University Film Festival for their work as composers on the short film “Tidy Up,” directed by Satsuki Okawa (2011), which has been released as a part of The Criterion Collection. Elegant Too have also won a Clio Award for their music in advertising.

Elegant Too are the composers for Bob's Burgers, for which they write numerous songs featured on the show. One song, "Bad Girls", from season 2, episode 8 of the series, was covered by St. Vincent. Elegant Too's work is regularly included on episodes of Bob's Burgers. This duo also wrote the music for Comedy Central's Inside Amy Schumer parody "Milk Milk Lemonade", which was on season 3, episode 1 "Last F... Able Day". This parody went viral with over eight million views on YouTube. They have composed music for other TV shows including the Emmy and Peabody award-winning ESPN series “30 for 30,” “Anthony Bourdain's No Reservations,” “John Oliver's New York Stand Up Show,” “Malcolm In The Middle,” “Walk The Prank,” “Dice,” “Important Things with Demetri Martin,” “The Whitest Kids You Know,” and many more.

In addition to their work in TV, Elegant Too have scored the horror film “Scare Me” which premiered at the 2020 Sundance Film Festival. Other films scored include: “For They Know Not What They Do” which premiered at the Tribeca Film Festival and “Take Care” written and directed by Liz Tuccillo (a writer for Sex and The City).  Their music has been featured in the Academy Award winning film “Silver Linings Playbook,” (the song “Goodnight Moon”) as well as other films including, Edgar Wright's “Hot Fuzz” (the song “Here Come The Fuzz”), Michel Gondry's “The We and The I” (the song “Pills”).

They are responsible for the music of Gillette's The Art of Shaving campaign commercial The Gentleman Shaver. This short film, which was released in February 2011 and directed by Ben Briand, won multiple awards including the Clio Award in 2012 for Film-Music original.

They participated in a collaboration with New York-based artists Mike Doughty and They Might Be Giants to produce the song "Mr. Xcitement".

Elegant Too earned a guest credit for their collaboration with Jonathan Coulton on a cover of "Want You Gone" that appeared on Coulton's 2011 album Artificial Heart.

References

American television composers
Musical groups from New York (state)